The Malaysia Crime Prevention Foundation (abbrev: MCPF) is a Malaysian non-profit governmental organization tasked to promote awareness in crime prevention and rehabilitation of offenders at all times. In addition to getting public participation in crime prevention efforts of the Government and other interested parties and NGOs.

It is established on 11 January 1993 and officially inaugurated by the then-Malaysian Prime Minister, Mahathir Mohamad who also served as the Patron of the foundation.

See also
 Prevention of Crime Act 1959
 Crime in Malaysia

References

External links
 

Organizations established in 1993
1993 establishments in Malaysia
Non-profit organisations based in Malaysia